This is a list of player transfers involving United Rugby Championship rugby union teams between the end of the 2021–22 season and before the start of the 2022–23 season.

Benetton

Players In
 Filippo Alongi from  Mogliano
 Sam Hidalgo-Clyne from  Exeter Chiefs 
 Tommaso Menoncello promoted from Academy 
 Alessandro Garbisi from  Mogliano 
 Giacomo Nicotera from  Rovigo Delta 
 Giacomo Da Re from  Rovigo Delta
 Filippo Drago from  Mogliano
 Matteo Drudi from  Mogliano
 Scott Scrafton from  Hurricanes
 Onisi Ratave from  Fijian Drua 
 Marco Zanon from  Pau 
 Marcus Watson from  Wasps
 Henry Stowers from  Moana Pasifika
  Manfredi Albanese from  Calvisano
  Manuel Arroyo from  Los Tordos
  Enzo Avaca from  Jaguares XV
  Giuliano Avaca from  Tala
  Alessandro Izekor from  Calvisano
  Matteo Meggiato from  Mogliano
  Dewi Passarella from  Rugby Ruggers Tarvisium
  Nicola Piantella from  Rovigo Delta
 Ignacio Mendy from  Jaguares XV
 Siua Maile from  Manawatu 
 Matteo Minozzi from  Wasps 
 Jacob Umaga from  Wasps 
 Bautista Bernasconi from  Jaguares XV

Players Out
 Callum Braley to  Northampton Saints 
 Hame Faiva to  Worcester Warriors 
 Irné Herbst to  Harlequins
 Tommaso Benvenuti released
 Luca Morisi to  London Irish 
 Joey Caputo to  Zebre Parma
 Franco Smith to  Zebre Parma
 Andries Coetzee to  Lions
 Yaree Fantini to  Darlington Mowden Park
 Luca Petrozzi to  London Scottish 
 Tommy Bell to  Tokyo Gas
 Luca Sperandio to  Albi  
 Monty Ioane to  Melbourne Rebels
 Tomás Baravalle to  Dallas Jackals 
 Iliesa Ratuva Tavuyara to  Rovigo Delta

Bulls

Players In
 Phumzile Maqondwana from  Pumas 
 Ruan Vermaak from  NTT DoCoMo Red Hurricanes 
 Sbu Nkosi from  Sharks
 Wandisile Simelane from  Lions 
 Mihlali Mosi from  Free State Cheetahs
 Chris Smit from  Free State Cheetahs
 Marco van Staden from  Leicester Tigers
 Nizaam Carr from  Wasps

Players Out
 Madosh Tambwe to  Bordeaux
 Sintu Manjezi to  Glasgow Warriors 
 Arno Botha to  Lyon
 Richard Kriel to  Zebre Parma
 Walt Steenkamp to  Mitsubishi Sagamihara DynaBoars
 Schalk Erasmus to  Kubota Spears Funabashi Tokyo Bay
 Marcell Coetzee to  Kobelco Kobe Steelers

Cardiff

Players In
 Taulupe Faletau from  Bath
 Thomas Young from  Wasps
 Liam Williams from  Scarlets 
 Efan Daniel promoted from Academy 
 Lopeti Timani from  Toulon
 Joe Peard from  Dragons
 Adam Williams from  Dragons

Players Out
 Hallam Amos retired
 Immanuel Feyi-Waboso to  Wasps
 Iestyn Harris to  Exeter Chiefs  
 Scott Andrews retired 
 Rhys Gill retired
 Alun Lawrence to  Jersey Reds
 Luke Scully released
 Will Boyde released 
 Jason Tovey to  Ynysddu
 Garyn Smith to  Cornish Pirates
 Lewis Jones to  Dragons
 Louie Hennessey to  Bath
 Nathan Evans to  Dragons
 Ben Burnell to  Jersey Reds 
 Rhys Anstey to  Ealing Trailfinders

Connacht

Players In
 Ciaran Booth promoted from Academy
 Cathal Forde promoted from Academy
 Shane Jennings promoted from Academy
 Diarmuid Kilgallen promoted from Academy
 Óisín McCormack promoted from Academy
 Darragh Murray promoted from Academy
 Josh Murphy from  Leinster
 Peter Dooley from  Leinster 
 Adam Byrne from  Leinster 
 Shamus Hurley-Langton from  Manawatu 
 Byron Ralston from  Western Force 
 David Hawkshaw from  Leinster
 Grant Stewart from  Glasgow Warriors (short-term deal)

Players Out
 Sammy Arnold to  Brive 
 Ultan Dillane to  La Rochelle 
 Abraham Papali'i to  Brive
 Matt Healy retired 
 Jonny Murphy released 
 Peter Sullivan released
 Eoghan Masterson to  Aurillac
 Peter Robb to  Ealing Trailfinders
 Tietie Tuimauga to  Wellington
 Greg McGrath to  Jersey Reds
 Ben O'Donnell to  Brumbies

Dragons

Players In
 Bradley Roberts from  Ulster 
 JJ Hanrahan from  Clermont 
 Rhodri Jones from  Ospreys 
 Sean Lonsdale from  Exeter Chiefs 
 Max Clark from  Bath 
 George Nott from  London Irish 
 Sio Tomkinson from  Highlanders 
 Angus O'Brien from  Scarlets
 Lewis Jones from  Cardiff 
 Rob Evans from  Scarlets
 Nathan Evans from  Cardiff
 Steffan Hughes from  Scarlets

Players Out
 Taylor Davies returned to  Scarlets
 Tom Griffiths released 
 Jordan Olowofela returned to  Leicester Tigers
 Max Williams released
 Josh Lewis to  Merthyr
 Jonah Holmes to  Ealing Trailfinders
 Dan Baker to  Aberavon
 Owen Jenkins to  Wales Sevens
 Will Talbot-Davies to  Coventry
 Greg Bateman retired
 Joe Maksymiw to  Agen 
 Evan Lloyd to  Ebbw Vale
 Carrick McDonough to  Ebbw Vale
 Adam Warren to  Llandovery
 Harry Fry to  Hartpury University
 Joe Peard to  Cardiff
 Dan Babos to  Pontypool
 Adam Williams to  Cardiff
 Mesake Doge to  Fijian Drua
 Cory Allen retired

Edinburgh

Players In
 Sam Skinner from  Exeter Chiefs 
 Jamie Jack from  Ampthill
 Wes Goosen from  Hurricanes 
 Nick Auterac from  Northampton Saints
 Duhan van der Merwe from  Worcester Warriors
 Tom Cruse from  Wasps (short-term deal) 
 Murray McCallum from  Worcester Warriors

Players Out
 Magnus Bradbury to  Bristol Bears 
 James Johnstone released 
 Ramiro Moyano released
 Sam Grahamslaw to  Jersey Reds
 Ben Toolis to  Hanazono Kintetsu Liners
 Nathan Chamberlain to  London Scottish
 Mesu Kunavula to  Brive
 Freddie Owsley to  Richmond

Glasgow Warriors

Players In
 JP du Preez from  Sale Sharks
 Sione Vailanu from  Worcester Warriors 
 Gregor Brown promoted from Academy 
 Angus Fraser promoted from Academy
 Alex Samuel promoted from Academy
 Max Williamson promoted from Academy
 Huw Jones from  Harlequins
 Sintu Manjezi from  Bulls
 Allan Dell from  London Irish
 Lucio Sordoni from  Mont-de-Marsan  
 Gregor Hiddleston from  Stirling County
 Cameron Neild from  Worcester Warriors
 Facundo Cordero from  Exeter Chiefs

Players Out
 Kiran McDonald to  Wasps 
 Robbie Fergusson released 
 Ewan McQuillin released
 Ratu Tagive released 
 Rob Harley to  Carcassonne 
 Hamish Bain to  Jersey Reds
 Grant Stewart to  Connacht
 Robbie McCallum to  London Scottish 
 Tom Lambert to  NSW Waratahs
 Rufus McLean released

Leinster

Players In
 Jason Jenkins from  Munster 
 Brian Deeny promoted from Academy 
 Cormac Foley promoted from Academy
 Joe McCarthy promoted from Academy
 Jamie Osborne promoted from Academy
 Charlie Ngatai from  Lyon
 Tadgh McElroy from  Ealing Trailfinders (short-term deal)

Players Out
 Josh Murphy to  Connacht 
 Peter Dooley to  Connacht
 Jack Dunne to  Exeter Chiefs 
 Rory O'Loughlin to  Exeter Chiefs
 Adam Byrne to  Connacht
 David Hawkshaw to  Connacht 
 Devin Toner retired 
 Seán Cronin retired
 Conor O'Brien retired
 James Tracy retired
 Charlie Ryan retired

Lions

Players In
 Marius Louw from  Sharks
 Andries Coetzee from  Benetton
 Ruan Smith from  NSW Waratahs
 Zander du Plessis from  Griquas 
 Sango Xamlashe from  Griquas
 Michael van Vuuren from  Wasps 
 JC Pretorius from  South Africa Sevens

Players Out
 Burger Odendaal to  Wasps
 Vincent Tshituka to  Sharks
 Carlü Sadie to  Sharks
 MJ Pelser to  Zebre Parma
 Wandisile Simelane to  Bulls
 Christopher Hollis to  Stormers
 Fred Zeilinga to  Sharks
 James Tedder to  Soyaux Angoulême 
 Emile van Heerden returned to  Sharks

Munster

Players In
 Scott Buckley promoted from Academy 
 Alex Kendellen promoted from Academy
 Malakai Fekitoa from  Wasps 
 Paddy Kelly promoted from Academy 
 Chris Moore from  University of Exeter
 Eoin O'Connor promoted from Academy
 Paddy Patterson promoted from Academy
 Antoine Frisch from  Bristol Bears
 Oli Morris from  Worcester Warriors
 John Ryan from  Wasps (short-term deal)
 Kiran McDonald from  Wasps (short-term deal)

Players Out
 Declan Moore to  Ulster
 Jason Jenkins to  Leinster
 Matt Gallagher to  Bath 
 Jake Flannery to  Ulster 
 Chris Cloete to  Bath 
 John Ryan to  Wasps
 Kevin O'Byrne to  Ealing Trailfinders
 Rowan Osborne retired
 Jonathan Wren retired
 Alex McHenry to  Jersey Reds 
 Seán French to  Bedford Blues 
 Damian de Allende to  Saitama Wild Knights
 John Ryan to  Chiefs
 Chris Farrell to  Oyonnax

Ospreys

Players In
 Jack Walsh from  Exeter Chiefs 
 Harri Deaves promoted from Academy
 Garyn Phillips promoted from Academy
 Owen Williams from  Worcester Warriors 
 Tom Cowan-Dickie from  Leicester Tigers

Players Out
 Rhodri Jones to  Dragons
 Josh Thomas to  Newcastle Falcons
 James Fender to  Cornish Pirates (season-long loan) 
 Callum Carson to  Aberavon
 Lloyd Ashley to  Merthyr
 Maʻafu Fia to  Perpignan
 Dewi Cross to  Cardiff RFC
 Morgan Strong to  Ampthill
 Benji Williams to  Cardiff Metropolitan University

Scarlets

Players In
 Vaea Fifita from  Wasps
 Iwan Shenton from  Aberavon 
 Griff Evans from  Llandovery
 Sam Wainwright from  Saracens

Players Out
 Liam Williams to  Cardiff 
 Angus O'Brien to  Dragons
 Marc Jones released
 Tom Phillips released
 Rob Evans to  Dragons
 Tomi Lewis to  Jersey Reds
 Tyler Morgan to  Biarritz
 Steffan Hughes to  Dragons
 Josh Helps retired 
 Blade Thomson retired
 Tomas Lezana to  Montauban

Sharks

Players In
 Eben Etzebeth from  Toulon
 Rohan Janse van Rensburg from  Sale Sharks 
 Nevaldo Fleurs from  Maties 
 Vincent Tshituka from  Lions 
 Carlü Sadie from  Lions 
 Lionel Cronjé from  Toyota Verblitz
 Justin Basson from  Rugby ATL 
 Fred Zeilinga from  Lions
 Francois Venter from  Worcester Warriors
 Emile van Heerden returned from  Lions

Players Out
 Sbu Nkosi to  Bulls
 Marius Louw to  Lions
 Ruben van Heerden to  Exeter Chiefs
 Joaquín Díaz Bonilla to  Hindú 
 Jeremy Ward to  Stade Français 
 Olajuwon Noah to  Bayonne

Stormers

Players In
 Joseph Dweba from  Bordeaux
 Clayton Blommetjies from  Free State Cheetahs
 Christopher Hollis from  Lions
 Gary Porter from  Ealing Trailfinders
 Alapati Leiua from  Bristol Bears
 Jean-Luc du Plessis from  Mie Honda Heat 
 Ruben van Heerden from  Exeter Chiefs

Players Out
 Warrick Gelant to  Racing 92
 Tim Swiel to  Toyota Industries Shuttles Aichi 
 Rikus Pretorius to  Kubota Spears Funabashi Tokyo Bay
 Sergeal Petersen to  Shimizu Koto Blue Sharks

Ulster

Players In
 Sean Reffell from  Saracens
 Jude Postlethwaite promoted from Academy 
 Declan Moore from  Munster
 Frank Bradshaw Ryan from  Nevers 
 Shea O'Brien from  Armagh 
 Jake Flannery from  Munster
 Jeffery Toomaga-Allen from  Wasps
 Michael McDonald from  Western Force
 Rory Sutherland from  Worcester Warriors

Players Out
 Bradley Roberts to  Dragons
 Ross Kane to  Ealing Trailfinders 
 Jack McGrath released 
 Mick Kearney retired 
 David O'Connor to  Ealing Trailfinders
 Sean Reidy to  Counties Manukau
 Conor Rankin to  Ampthill

Zebre Parma

Players In
 Giampietro Ribaldi from  Viadana 
 Juan Pitinari from  Noceto 
 Simone Gesi from  Colorno 
 Guido Volpi from  Doncaster Knights 
 Dennis Visser from  Narbonne 
 Damiano Mazza from  Calvisano 
 Ratko Jelic from  Viadana
 Jacques du Toit from  Bath
 Alessio Sanavia from  Valorugby Emilia
 Muhamed Hasa from  Petrarca
 MJ Pelser from  Lions
 Davide Ruggeri from  Rovigo Delta 
 Jan Uys from  Grenoble
  Gonzalo García from  Valorugby Emilia
 Tiff Eden from  Bristol Bears 
 Joey Caputo from  Benetton
  Franco Smith from  Benetton
  Kobus van Wyk unattached 
 Richard Kriel from  Bulls
 Matteo Moscardi from  Rovigo Delta
 Nicolò Teneggi from  Valorugby Emilia 
 Joshua Furno from  Bourg-en-Bresse
 Gerónimo Prisciantelli from  Jaguares XV 
 Latu Latunipulu from  Bourg-en-Bresse
 Matt Kvesic from  Worcester Warriors

Players Out
 Oliviero Fabiani to  Colorno 
 Asaeli Tuivuaka to  Racing 92 
 Andrea Lovotti to  Colorno 
 Giulio Bisegni to  Colorno  
 Gabriele Di Giulio released
 Renato Giammarioli to  Worcester Warriors
 Maxime Mbanda to  Colorno
 Danilo Fischetti to  London Irish 
 Eduardo Bello to  Saracens 
 Liam Mitchell to  Saitama Wild Knights
 Junior Laloifi released
 Tim O'Malley released
 Guglielmo Palazzani to  Calvisano 
 Jimmy Tuivaiti to  Valorugby Emilia
 Potu Leavasa Jr. to  Manawatu
 Massimo Ceciliani to  Calvisano 
 Michelangelo Biondelli to  Fiamme Oro
 Carlo Canna to  Fiamme Oro
 Giovanni D'Onofrio to  Fiamme Oro
 Cristian Stoian to  Fiamme Oro
 Marcello Violi to  Valorugby Emilia
 Latu Latunipulu released
 Matteo Moscardi to  Rovigo Delta
 Nicolò Casilio to  Colorno

See also
List of 2022–23 Premiership Rugby transfers
List of 2022–23 RFU Championship transfers
List of 2022–23 Super Rugby transfers
List of 2022–23 Top 14 transfers
List of 2022–23 Rugby Pro D2 transfers
List of 2022–23 Major League Rugby transfers

References

2022–23 United Rugby Championship
2022-23